Khar Farih, also rendered as Har Farih, Kharfareh, Kharfereh, Kher Fereh, and Khorofray, may refer to:
 Khar Farih-e Olya
 Makineh-ye Khar Farih